The geocorona is the luminous part of the outermost region of the Earth's atmosphere, the exosphere. It is seen primarily via far-ultraviolet light (Lyman-alpha) from the Sun that is scattered from neutral hydrogen. It extends to at minimum 15.5 Earth radii and probably up to about 100 Earth radii. The geocorona has been studied from outer space by the Astrid satellites and the Galileo spacecraft (among others), using its ultraviolet spectrometer (UVS) during an Earth flyby.

See also
 Stellar corona
 Atmosphere of Earth

References

External links
 Geocorona at Southwest Research Institute 

Atmosphere of Earth